Nausithoidae is a family of jellyfish.

Genera
Nausithoe
 Nausithoe albatrossi (Maas, 1897)
 Nausithoe atlantica (Broch, 1914)
 Nausithoe aurea Da Silveira & Morandini, 1997
 Nausithoe challengeri (Haeckel, 1880)
 Nausithoe clausi (Vanhöffen, 1892)
 Nausithoe eumedusoides Werner, 1974
 Nausithoe globifera (Bloch, 1914)
 Nausithoe hagenbeckii Jarms, 2001
 Nausithoe limpida (Hartlaub, 1909)
 Nausithoe maculata Jarms, 1990
 Nausithoe marginata (Kölliker, 1853)
 Nausithoe picta (Agassiz & Mayer, 1902)
 Nausithoe planulophora Werner, 1971
 Nausithoe planulophorus Werner, 1971
 Nausithoe punctata (Kölliker, 1853)
 Nausithoe racemosa (Komai, 1936)
 Nausithoe rubra (Vanhöffen, 1902)
 Nausithoe simplex (Kirkpatrick, 1890)
 Nausithoe sorbei Jarms, Tiemann & Prados, 2003
 Nausithoe striata (Vanhöffen, 1910)
 Nausithoe thieli Jarms, 1990
 Nausithoe werneri Jarms, 1990
Palephyra
 Palephyra antiqua 
 Palephyra indica (Vanhöffen, 1902)
 Palephyra pelagica (Haeckel, 1880)
Thecoscyphus
 Thecoscyphus zibrowii Werner, 1984

References

 
Cnidarian families
Coronatae